Rosa Gutiérrez de Pardo (11 June 1919 – 21 January 1990) was a Mexican diver. She competed in the Women's 10 metre platform event at the 1948 Summer Olympics.

Notes

References

External links
 

1919 births
1990 deaths
Mexican female divers
Olympic divers of Mexico
Divers at the 1948 Summer Olympics